Irfan Fejzić (born 1 July 1986) is a Bosnian professional footballer who plays as a goalkeeper.

Career statistics

Club

Personal life
Fejzić's cousin, Nevres, is also a professional footballer who plays as a goalkeeper for Bosnian Premier League club Tuzla City.

Honours
Sarajevo
Bosnian Premier League: 2006–07

Željezničar 
Bosnian Cup: 2017–18

References

External links
Irfan Fejzić at Sofascore

1986 births
Living people
Footballers from Sarajevo
Association football goalkeepers
Bosnia and Herzegovina footballers
FK Sarajevo players
FK Goražde players 
FK Olimpik players
FK Mughan players
NK Zvijezda Gradačac players
FK Rudar Kakanj players 
FK Sloboda Tuzla players
FK Željezničar Sarajevo players
Premier League of Bosnia and Herzegovina players
Azerbaijan Premier League players 
First League of the Federation of Bosnia and Herzegovina players
Bosnia and Herzegovina expatriate footballers
Expatriate footballers in Azerbaijan
Bosnia and Herzegovina expatriate sportspeople in Azerbaijan